The International Journal of Middle East Studies is a scholarly journal published by the Middle East Studies Association of North America (MESA), a learned society.

See also
 Middle East Research and Information Project
 Association for the Study of the Middle East and Africa
 Middle East Quarterly

References

External links 
 IJMES Editorial Office at The Graduate Center, CUNY
 On-line archive at Cambridge University Press

Middle Eastern studies in the United States
Non-Islamic Islam studies literature
Quarterly journals
Cambridge University Press academic journals
English-language journals
Middle Eastern studies journals
Academic journals associated with learned and professional societies
Publications established in 1970